Dirt track racing is a type of auto racing performed on oval tracks in Australia.

Venues

Australian Capital Territory
Farmers market speed way

New South Wales

Northern Territory

Queensland

South Australia

Tasmania

Victoria

Western Australia

References

External links

Avalon Raceway
Blue Ribbon Raceway
Borderline Speedway
Bunbury Speedway
Carrick Speedway
Corowa/Rutherglen Speedway
Gillman Speedway
Gunnedah Speedway
Heartland Raceway
Lismore & Grafton Speedways
Loxford Park Speedway - Kurri Kurri Speedway Club
Mothar Mountain Speedway - Gympie Saloon Car Club Ltd.
Murray Bridge Speedway
Nowra Speedway
Olympic Park Speedway - Mildura Motorcycle Club
Perth Motorplex
Premier Speedway
Rushworth Speedway - Goulburn Valley Auto Club
Sidewinders Junior Speedway
Sonic Speedway
Speedway City
Sydney Speedway
Timmis Speedway
Tolmer Speedway
Wangaratta Speedway
List of all active Australian Dirt Tracks on dirtFan.com

Ovals
 
Dirt track ovals